The Ministry of Defence of Djibouti is the governmental body in charge of the Djibouti Armed Forces (DJAF). It is Djibouti's ministry of defence. Hassan Omar Mohamed is the current Minister of Defense.

See also
 Ministries of Djibouti

References
 Chiefs of State and Cabinet Members of Foreign Governments
 Composition du gouvernement de la République de Djibouti

Government of Djibouti
Military of Djibouti